Mohammed Al-Dahi (born 14 September 1988) is a Saudi football player who current plays as a winger and left back . He was part of Al-Fayha's squad which won the First Division title.

Honours
Al-Fayha
 Saudi First Division: 2016–17

References

1988 births
Living people
Saudi Arabian footballers
Al-Taawoun FC players
Al-Wehda Club (Mecca) players
Khaleej FC players
Al-Nahda Club (Saudi Arabia) players
Al-Fayha FC players
Al Safa FC players
Al-Rawdhah Club players
Saudi First Division League players
Saudi Professional League players
Saudi Second Division players
Association football wingers
Association football fullbacks